Iris hartwegii is a species of iris endemic to California, where it can be found on low-elevation mountain slopes in the central counties. It has many common names including; foothill iris, rainbow iris, Sierra iris, and Hartweg's iris.

It bears one to three flowers on a slender stem, and the flowers may be shades of purple or yellow to almost white. It has lavender veining. There were three to five subspecies, but these are now considered synonyms.

References

External links
Jepson Manual Treatment - Iris hartwegii
USDA Plants Profile; Iris hartwegii
pacificcoastiris.org: Population study; Iris hartwegii
Flora of North America
Iris hartwegii - Photo gallery

hartwegii
Endemic flora of California
Flora of the Sierra Nevada (United States)
Flora of the Cascade Range
Natural history of the California chaparral and woodlands
Natural history of the Transverse Ranges